Les Films du Poisson is a French film production company founded in 1995 by Yael Fogiel and Laetitia Gonzalez.
The company has produced more than a hundred films: features, documentaries and shorts. Many have won awards in France and around the world. In 2011 France's Academy of Film names Les Films du Poisson Best Producers.

Selective filmography

2023
 Orlando, My Political Biography directed by Paul B. Preciado

2019
The Room, directed by Christian Volckman

2014
The Dune, directed by 	Yossi Aviram

2013
Friends From France, directed by Anne Weil and Philippe Kotlarski

2012
The Gatekeepers, directed by Dror Moreh
Beautiful Valley, directed by Hadar Friedlich
Land of Oblivion, directed by Emmanuel Finkiel

2011
Land of Oblivion, directed by Michale Boganim
Diary, Letters, Revolutions..., directed by Flavia Castro

2010
The Tree, directed by Julie Bertuccelli, with Charlotte Gainsbourg, 2010 Cannes Film Festival: official selection, out of competition
On Tour, directed by Mathieu Amalric, Best Director Award (Cannes Film Festival), FIPRESCI Award
Lignes de Front, directed by Jean-Christophe Klotz

2009
La Grande vie, by Emmanuel Salinger

2007
Jellyfish, by Etgar Keret, Camera d'Or prize at the 2007 Cannes Film Festival

2003
Since Otar Left, by Julie Bertuccelli, Critics Week Grand Prize at the 2003 Cannes Film Festival

2000
Voyages, by Emmanuel Finkiel, César Award for Best Debut

External links
Official site
Les Films du Poisson at the Internet Movie Database

1995 establishments in France
Film production companies of France
Mass media in Paris